Alonso González de Berruguete (Alonso Berruguete) (c. 1488 – 1561) was a Spanish painter, sculptor and architect. He is considered to be the most important sculptor of the Spanish Renaissance, and is known for his emotive sculptures depicting religious ecstasy or torment.

Born in the town of Paredes de Nava, Berruguete studied art under the tutelage of his father, the painter Pedro Berruguete. Following his father's death in 1504, Berruguete travelled to Italy to continue his study of art, spending most of his time in Florence and Rome. It is here that he studied sculpture under the Italian master, Michelangelo. His paintings produced in Italy showed a mannerist influence, with his art being compared with contemporaries such as Jacopo Pontormo and Rosso Fiorentino.

Berruguete returned to Spain in 1517, and in 1518, was appointed to the position of court painter and sculptor by Charles V of Spain. From this point in his career forward, Berruguete concentrated on sculpture. Works of his include an altarpiece at the Irish college in Salamanca (1529–1533), choir stalls at the Cathedral of Toledo (1539–1543) and a tomb for the Archbishop of Toledo Juan de Tavera at the hospital that Tavera founded, the hospital of St. John the Baptist in Toledo (1552–1561).

Wood sculpture
After his training in Italy he went back to the Spanish tradition of making wood sculptures, which included the altarpieces at the church of San Benito el Real, Valladolid. "The exaggerated movements of his figures became a mannerism with his followers Andrés de Nájera, Esteban Jordán, Inocencio Berruguete and others..."

From October 13, 2019 – February 17, 2020, over 40 of Berruguete's painted wood sculptures were on display in the National Gallery of Art, Washington, D.C. as part of an exhibition titled Alonso Berruguette: First Sculptor of Renaissance Spain.

References

External links

Catholic Encyclopedia entry

1480s births
1561 deaths
People from the Province of Palencia
Spanish architects
15th-century Spanish painters
Spanish male painters
16th-century Spanish painters
16th-century Spanish sculptors
Spanish male sculptors
Court painters
Renaissance sculptors
Catholic sculptors